Laurentien (originally Laurentian) was a Canadian brand of art supplies owned by Sanford Canada. The line of supplies included coloured pencils, markers and crayons.  The line of Laurentian coloured pencils was discontinued around 2012 and their websites no longer exist. Laurentien was marketed in the United States under the name Paradise.

History 
Laurentien was originally owned by Venus Pencils and was originally spelled Laurentian. During the 1960s, the packaging of Laurentien's products changed to become a portable vinyl pouch and the colour pencils now had space for labeling on the pencil supposedly to "deter theft from classmates". In 1972, Laurentian's name was changed to Laurentien, supposedly in an attempt to increase sales in Quebec. In 1994, Sanford L.P. acquired Laurentien. In 2001, Sanford L.P. discontinued the vinyl pouch design and used a cardboard box instead. Laurentien's website stated that this was due to consumers being more likely to put the coloured pencils in a pencil case. In 2012, Laurentien ceased the production of its coloured pencils.

Coloured pencils
Laurentien brand coloured pencils are also known as "pencil crayons" in Canada. They were available in packages of differing sizes. Each coloured pencil is painted in a colour matching the lead, and labelled in white (Cotton White has yellow lettering) with both the name of the colour and a number assigned to each colour.

1: Deep Yellow
2: Orange (originally Sarasota Orange)
3: Poppy Red
4: Cerise (originally Hollywood Cerise)
5: Purple (originally Orchid Purple)
6: Navy Blue
7: Peacock Blue
8: Emerald Green
9: Deep Green (originally Deep Chrome Green)
10: Brown (originally Photo Brown)
11: Chestnut (originally Chestnut Brown)
12: Black (originally Midnight Black)
13: Ultramarine (originally Ultramarine Blue)
14: Soft Peach (originally Natural Flesh)
15: Green (originally Lawn Green)
16: French Green
17: Smoke Grey
18: Blush Pink
19: Cherry Red
20: Arizona Topaz
21: Roan Red (originally Indian Red)
22: Sky Magenta
23: White (originally Cotton White)
24: Lemon Yellow
25: True Blue
26: Brown Sienna (originally Burnt Sienna)
27: True Green
28: Scarlet
29: Lavender
30: Light Orange
31: Crimson
32: Cardinal Red
33: Tangerine (originally Sun Orange)
34: Cream (replaced Mauve)
35: Canary Yellow (replaced Saddle Brown)
36: Raspberry
37: Grape-Violet (replaced Green)
38: Aqua
39: Ocean Blue
40: Blue
41: Blueberry
42: Celery
43: Peacock Green
44: Coffee (replaced Copper)
45: Cinnamon
46: Tuscan Red
47: Pastel Green (replaced Cocoa)
48: Dark Brown
49: Sienna (replaced Gold)
50: Light Yellow (replaced Light Grey)
51: Cloud Grey
52: Mandarin (replaced Grey)
53: Blue Grey
54: Dark Grey
55: Champagne (replaced Thunder Grey)
56: Azure (replaced Light Black)
57: Pine Green (replaced Charcoal)
58: Turquoise
59: True Pink (replaced Silver)
60: Khaki

Past colours
34 Mauve
37 Green
44 Copper  
47 Cocoa  
49 Gold  
50 Light Grey  
52 Grey  
55 Thunder Grey  
56 Light Black  
57 Charcoal  
59 Silver

Additional metallic colours were also available and appeared in a separate Laurentien Metallic Pencil Crayon Set in 2004.  The colours in the metallic set were:

61: Metallic Rose
62: Metallic Gold
66: Metallic Green
67: Metallic Blue
69: Metallic Purple
72: Metallic Silver

References

Products introduced in 1951